The Monroe Doctrine was a United States foreign policy position that opposed European colonialism in the Western Hemisphere. It held that any intervention in the political affairs of the Americas by foreign powers was a potentially hostile act against the United States. The doctrine was central to American foreign policy for much of the 19th and early 20th centuries.

President James Monroe first articulated the doctrine on December 2, 1823, during his seventh annual State of the Union Address to Congress (though it would not be named after him until 1850). At the time, nearly all Spanish colonies in the Americas had either achieved or were close to independence. Monroe asserted that the New World and the Old World were to remain distinctly separate spheres of influence, and thus further efforts by European powers to control or influence sovereign states in the region would be viewed as a threat to U.S. security. In turn, the United States would recognize and not interfere with existing European colonies nor meddle in the internal affairs of European countries.

Because the U.S. lacked both a credible navy and army at the time of the doctrine's proclamation, it was largely disregarded by the colonial powers. While it was successfully enforced in part by the United Kingdom, who used it as an opportunity to enforce its own Pax Britannica policy, the doctrine was still broken several times over the course of the 19th century. By the turn of the 20th century, however, the United States itself was able to  successfully enforce the doctrine, and it became seen as a defining moment in the foreign policy of the United States and one of its longest-standing tenets. The intent and effect of the doctrine persisted for over a century after that, with only small variations, and would be invoked by many American statesmen and several American presidents, including Ulysses S. Grant, Theodore Roosevelt, John F. Kennedy, and Ronald Reagan.

After 1898, the Monroe Doctrine was reinterpreted by Latin American lawyers and intellectuals as promoting multilateralism and non-intervention. In 1933, under President Franklin D. Roosevelt, the United States affirmed this new interpretation, namely through co-founding the Organization of American States. Into the 21st century, the doctrine continues to be variably denounced, reinstated, or reinterpreted.

Seeds of the Monroe Doctrine 

Despite the United States' beginnings as an isolationist country, the foundation of the Monroe Doctrine was already being laid even during George Washington's presidency. According to S.E. Morison, "as early as 1783, then, the United States adopted the policy of isolation and announced its intention to keep out of Europe. The supplementary principle of the Monroe Doctrine, that Europe must keep out of America, was still over the horizon".

While not specifically the Monroe Doctrine,  but this was extended to the Latin American colonies by the Monroe Doctrine. But Hamilton, writing in the Federalist Papers, was already wanting to establish the United States as a world power and hoped that it would suddenly become strong enough to keep the European powers outside of the Americas, despite the fact that the European countries controlled much more of the Americas than the U.S. herself. Hamilton expected that the United States would become the dominant power in the New World and would, in the future, act as an intermediary between the European powers and any new countries blossoming near the U.S.

A note from James Madison (Thomas Jefferson's Secretary of State and a future president) to the U.S. ambassador to Spain, expressed the American federal government’s opposition to further territorial acquisition by European powers. Madison's sentiment might have been meaningless because, as was noted before, the European powers held much more territory in comparison to the territory held by the U.S. Although Thomas Jefferson was pro-French, in an attempt to keep the British–French rivalry out the U.S., the federal government under Jefferson made it clear to its ambassadors that the U.S. would not support any future colonization efforts on the North American continent.

The U.S. government feared the victorious European powers that emerged from the Congress of Vienna (1814–1815) would revive monarchical government. France had already agreed to restore the Spanish monarchy in exchange for Cuba.  As the revolutionary Napoleonic Wars (1803–1815) ended, Prussia, Austria, and Russia formed the Holy Alliance to defend monarchism. In particular, the Holy Alliance authorized military incursions to re-establish Bourbon rule over Spain and its colonies, which were establishing their independence.

Great Britain shared the general objective of the Monroe Doctrine, and even wanted to declare a joint statement to keep other European powers from further colonizing the New World. The British feared their trade with the New World would be harmed if the other European powers further colonized it. In fact, for many years after the doctrine took effect, Britain, through the Royal Navy, was the sole nation enforcing it, the U.S. lacking sufficient naval capability. The U.S. resisted a joint statement because of the recent memory of the War of 1812; however, the immediate provocation was the Russian Ukase of 1821 asserting rights to the Pacific Northwest and forbidding non-Russian ships from approaching the coast.

Doctrine
The full document of the Monroe Doctrine, written chiefly by future-President and then-Secretary of State John Quincy Adams, is long and couched in diplomatic language, but its essence is expressed in two key passages. The first is the introductory statement, which asserts that the New World is no longer subject to colonization by the European countries:

The second key passage, which contains a fuller statement of the Doctrine, is addressed to the "allied powers" of Europe; it clarifies that the U.S. remains neutral on existing European colonies in the Americas but is opposed to "interpositions" that would create new colonies among the newly independent Spanish American republics:

Effects

International response
Because the U.S. lacked both a credible navy and army at the time, the doctrine was largely disregarded internationally. Prince Metternich of Austria was angered by the statement, and wrote privately that the doctrine was a "new act of revolt" by the U.S. that would grant "new strength to the apostles of sedition and reanimate the courage of every conspirator."

The doctrine, however, met with tacit British approval. They enforced it tactically as part of the wider Pax Britannica, which included enforcement of the neutrality of the seas. This was in line with the developing British policy of laissez-faire free trade against mercantilism. Fast-growing British industry sought markets for its manufactured goods, and, if the newly independent Latin American states became Spanish colonies again, British access to these markets would be cut off by Spanish mercantilist policy.

Latin American reaction
The reaction in Latin America to the Monroe Doctrine was generally favorable but on some occasions suspicious. John A. Crow, author of The Epic of Latin America, states, "Simón Bolívar himself, still in the midst of his last campaign against the Spaniards, Santander in Colombia, Rivadavia in Argentina, Victoria in Mexico—leaders of the emancipation movement everywhere—received Monroe's words with sincerest gratitude". Crow argues that the leaders of Latin America were realists. They knew that the president of the United States wielded very little power at the time, particularly without the backing of the British forces, and figured that the Monroe Doctrine was unenforceable if the United States stood alone against the Holy Alliance. While they appreciated and praised their support in the north, they knew that the future of their independence was in the hands of the British and their powerful navy. In 1826, Bolivar called upon his Congress of Panama to host the first "Pan-American" meeting. In the eyes of Bolivar and his men, the Monroe Doctrine was to become nothing more than a tool of national policy. According to Crow, "It was not meant to be, and was never intended to be a charter for concerted hemispheric action".

At the same time, some people questioned the intentions behind the Monroe Doctrine. Diego Portales, a Chilean businessman and minister, wrote to a friend: "But we have to be very careful: for the Americans of the north [from the United States], the only Americans are themselves".

Post-Bolívar events

In Spanish America, Royalist guerrillas continued the war in several countries, and Spain attempted to retake Mexico in 1829. Only Cuba and Puerto Rico remained under Spanish rule, until the Spanish–American War in 1898.

In early 1833, the British reasserted their sovereignty over the Falkland islands, thus violating the Monroe Doctrine. No action was taken by the US, and George C. Herring writes that the inaction "confirmed Latin American and especially Argentine suspicions of the United States." In 1838–50 Argentina was under constant naval blockade by the French navy, which was supported by the British navy, and as such, no action was undertaken by the U.S. to support their fellow Americas nation as Monroe had stated should be done for collective security against European colonial powers.

In 1842, U.S. President John Tyler applied the Monroe Doctrine to Hawaii and warned Britain not to interfere there. This began the process of annexing Hawaii to the U.S.

On December 2, 1845, U.S. President James Polk announced that the principle of the Monroe Doctrine should be strictly enforced, reinterpreting it to argue that no European nation should interfere with the American western expansion ("Manifest Destiny").

In 1861, Dominican military commander and royalist politician Pedro Santana signed a pact with the Spanish Crown and reverted the Dominican nation to colonial status. Spain was wary at first, but with the U.S. occupied with its own civil war, Spain believed it had an opportunity to reassert control in Latin America. On March 18, 1861, the Spanish annexation of the Dominican Republic was announced. The American Civil War ended in 1865, and following the re-assertion of the Monroe Doctrine by the United States government, this prompted the Spanish forces stationed within the Dominican Republic to extradite back to Cuba within that same year.

In 1862, French forces under Napoleon III invaded and conquered Mexico, giving control to the puppet monarch Emperor Maximilian. Washington denounced this as a violation of the doctrine but was unable to intervene because of the American Civil War. This marked the first time the Monroe Doctrine was widely referred to as a "doctrine." In 1865 the U.S. garrisoned an army on its border to encourage Napoleon III to leave Mexican territory, and they did subsequently remove their forces, which was followed by Mexican nationalists capturing and then executing Maximilian. After the expulsion of France from Mexico, William H. Seward proclaimed in 1868 that the "Monroe doctrine, which eight years ago was merely a theory, is now an irreversible fact."

In 1865, Spain occupied the Chincha Islands in violation of the Monroe Doctrine.

In 1862, the remaining British colonies within Belize merged into a single crown colony within the British Empire, and renamed as British Honduras. The U.S. government did not express disapproval for this action, either during or after the Civil War.

In the 1870s, President Ulysses S. Grant and his Secretary of State Hamilton Fish endeavored to supplant European influence in Latin America with that of the U.S. In 1870, the Monroe Doctrine was expanded under the proclamation "hereafter no territory on this continent [referring to Central and South America] shall be regarded as subject to transfer to a European power." Grant invoked the Monroe Doctrine in his failed attempt to annex the Dominican Republic in 1870.

The Venezuelan crisis of 1895 became "one of the most momentous episodes in the history of Anglo-American relations in general and of Anglo-American rivalries in Latin America in particular." Venezuela sought to involve the U.S. in a territorial dispute with Britain over Guayana Esequiba, and hired former US ambassador William L. Scruggs to argue that British behaviour over the issue violated the Monroe Doctrine. President Grover Cleveland through his Secretary of State, Richard Olney, cited the Doctrine in 1895, threatening strong action against Great Britain if the British failed to arbitrate their dispute with Venezuela. In a July 20, 1895 note to Britain, Olney stated, "The United States is practically sovereign on this continent, and its fiat is law upon the subjects to which it confines its interposition." British Prime Minister Lord Salisbury took strong exception to the American language. The U.S. objected to a British proposal for a joint meeting to clarify the scope of the Monroe Doctrine. Historian George Herring wrote that by failing to pursue the issue further the British "tacitly conceded the U.S. definition of the Monroe Doctrine and its hegemony in the hemisphere." Otto von Bismarck, did not agree and in October 1897 called the Doctrine an "uncommon insolence". Sitting in Paris, the Tribunal of Arbitration finalized its decision on October 3, 1899. The award was unanimous, but gave no reasons for the decision, merely describing the resulting boundary, which gave Britain almost 90% of the disputed territory  and all of the gold mines.

The reaction to the award was surprise, with the award's lack of reasoning a particular concern. The Venezuelans were keenly disappointed with the outcome, though they honored their counsel for their efforts (their delegation's secretary, received the Order of the Liberator in 1944), and abided by the award.

The Anglo-Venezuelan boundary dispute asserted for the first time a more outward-looking American foreign policy, particularly in the Americas, marking the U.S. as a world power. This was the earliest example of modern interventionism under the Monroe Doctrine in which the USA exercised its claimed prerogatives in the Americas.

In 1898, the U.S. intervened in support of Cuba during its war for independence from Spain. The resulting Spanish–American War ended in a peace treaty requiring Spain to cede Puerto Rico, the Philippines, and Guam to the U.S. in exchange for $20 million. Spain was additionally forced to recognize Cuban independence, though the island remained under U.S. occupation until 1902.

"Big Brother"

The "Big Brother" policy was an extension of the Monroe Doctrine formulated by James G. Blaine in the 1880s that aimed to rally Latin American nations behind US leadership and open their markets to US traders. Blaine served as Secretary of State in 1881 under President James A. Garfield and again from 1889 to 1892 under President Benjamin Harrison. As a part of the policy, Blaine arranged and led the First International Conference of American States in 1889.

"Olney Corollary"

The Olney Corollary, also known as the Olney interpretation or Olney declaration was United States Secretary of State Richard Olney's interpretation of the Monroe Doctrine when the border dispute for Guayana Esequiba occurred between the British and Venezuelan governments in 1895. Olney claimed that the Monroe Doctrine gave the U.S. authority to mediate border disputes in the Western Hemisphere. Olney extended the meaning of the Monroe Doctrine, which had previously stated merely that the Western Hemisphere was closed to additional European colonization. The statement reinforced the original purpose of the Monroe Doctrine, that the U.S. had the right to intervene in its own hemisphere and foreshadowed the events of the Spanish–American War three years later. The Olney interpretation was defunct by 1933.

Canada
In 1902, Canadian Prime Minister Wilfrid Laurier acknowledged that the Monroe Doctrine was essential to his country's protection. The doctrine provided Canada with a de facto security guarantee by the United States; the US Navy in the Pacific, and the British Navy in the Atlantic, made invading North America almost impossible. Because of the peaceful relations between the two countries, Canada could assist Britain in a European war without having to defend itself at home.

"Roosevelt Corollary"
 	
The Doctrine's authors, chiefly future-President and then Secretary-of-State John Quincy Adams, saw it as a proclamation by the U.S. of moral opposition to colonialism, but it has subsequently been re-interpreted and applied in a variety of instances. As the U.S. began to emerge as a world power, the Monroe Doctrine came to define a recognized sphere of control that few dared to challenge.

Before becoming president, Theodore Roosevelt had proclaimed the rationale of the Monroe Doctrine in supporting intervention in the Spanish colony of Cuba in 1898. The Venezuela Crisis of 1902–1903 showed the world that the U.S. was willing to use its naval strength to intervene to stabilize the economic affairs of small states in the Caribbean and Central America if they were unable to pay their international debts, in order to preclude European intervention to do so. The Venezuela crisis, and in particular the arbitral award, were key in the development of the Corollary.

In Argentine foreign policy, the Drago Doctrine was announced on December 29, 1902, by the foreign minister of Argentina, Luis María Drago. The doctrine itself was a response to the actions of Britain, Germany, and Italy, which, in 1902, had blockaded Venezuela in response to Venezuelan government's refusal to pay its massive foreign debt that had been acquired under previous administrations before President Cipriano Castro took power.  Drago set forth the policy that no European power could use force against an American nation to collect debt owed. President Theodore Roosevelt rejected this policy as an extension of the Monroe Doctrine, declaring, "We do not guarantee any state against punishment if it misconducts itself".

Instead, Roosevelt added the Roosevelt Corollary to the Monroe Doctrine in 1904, asserting the right of the U.S. to intervene in Latin America in cases of "flagrant and chronic wrongdoing by a Latin American Nation" to preempt intervention by European creditors. This re-interpretation of the Monroe Doctrine went on to be a useful tool to take economic benefits by force when Latin nations failed to pay their debts to European and US banks and business interests. This was also referred to as the Big Stick ideology because of the oft-quoted phrase from President Roosevelt, "speak softly and carry a big stick". The Roosevelt corollary provoked outrage across Latin America.

The Roosevelt Corollary was invoked to intervene militarily in Latin America to stop the spread of European influence.  It was the most significant amendment to the original doctrine and was widely opposed by critics, who argued that the Monroe Doctrine was originally meant to stop European influence in the Americas.  They argued that the Corollary simply asserted U.S. domination in that area, effectively making them a "hemispheric policeman."

Lodge Corollary
The so-called "Lodge Corollary" was passed by the U.S. Senate on August 2, 1912, in response to a reported attempt by a Japan-backed private company to acquire Magdalena Bay in southern Baja California. It extended the reach of the Monroe Doctrine to cover actions of corporations and associations controlled by foreign states.

Global Monroe Doctrine
Scholars such as Neil Smith have written that Woodrow Wilson effectively proposed a "Global Monroe Doctrine" expanding US supremacy over the entire world. Some analysts assert that this prerogative for indirect control and sporadic invasions and occupations across the planet has largely come to fruition with the American superpower role since World War II. Such a expansion of the doctrine is premised on the "nominal equality" of independent states. Such superficial equality is often undermined by material inequality, making the US a de facto global empire. Smith argued that the founding of the United Nations played a role in the establishing this global protectorate situation.

Clark Memorandum
The Clark Memorandum, written on December 17, 1928, by Calvin Coolidge's undersecretary of state J. Reuben Clark, concerned U.S. use of military force to intervene in Latin American nations. This memorandum was officially released in 1930 by the Herbert Hoover administration.

The Clark memorandum rejected the view that the Roosevelt Corollary was based on the Monroe Doctrine. However, it was not a complete repudiation of the Roosevelt Corollary but was rather a statement that any intervention by the U.S. was not sanctioned by the Monroe Doctrine but rather was the right of the U.S. as a state. This separated the Roosevelt Corollary from the Monroe Doctrine by noting that the Monroe Doctrine only applied to situations involving European countries. One main point in the Clark Memorandum was to note that the Monroe Doctrine was based on conflicts of interest only between the United States and European nations, rather than between the United States and Latin American nations.

World War II
After World War II began, a majority of Americans supported defending the entire Western Hemisphere against foreign invasion. A 1940 national survey found that 81% supported defending Canada; 75% Mexico and Central America; 69% South America; 66% West Indies; and 59% Greenland.

The December 1941 conquest of Saint Pierre and Miquelon by the forces of Free France from out of the control of Vichy France was seen as a violation of the Monroe Doctrine by Secretary of State Cordell Hull.

Latin American reinterpretation
After 1898, jurists and intellectuals in Argentina, Brazil, Chile, and Uruguay, especially Luis María Drago, Alejandro Álvarez and Baltasar Brum, reinterpreted the Monroe Doctrine. They sought a fresh continental approach to international law in terms of multilateralism and non-intervention. Indeed, an alternative Spanish American origin of the idea was proposed, attributing it to Manuel Torres. However, American leaders were reluctant to renounce unilateral interventionism until the Good Neighbor policy enunciated by President Franklin Roosevelt in 1933. The era of the Good Neighbor Policy ended with the ramp-up of the Cold War in 1945, as the United States felt there was a greater need to protect the western hemisphere from Soviet influence. These changes conflicted with the Good Neighbor Policy's fundamental principle of non-intervention and led to a new wave of US involvement in Latin American affairs. Control of the Monroe doctrine thus shifted to the multilateral Organization of American States (OAS) founded in 1948.

In 1954, Secretary of State John Foster Dulles invoked the Monroe Doctrine at the 10th Pan-American Conference in Caracas, Venezuela, denouncing the intervention of Soviet Communism in Guatemala.  President John F. Kennedy said at an August 29, 1962 news conference:

Cold War

During the Cold War, the Monroe Doctrine was applied to Latin America by the framers of U.S. foreign policy. When the Cuban Revolution (1953–1959) established a communist government with ties to the Soviet Union, it was argued that the Monroe Doctrine should be invoked to prevent the spread of Soviet-backed communism in Latin America. Under this rationale, the U.S. provided intelligence and military aid to Latin and South American governments that claimed or appeared to be threatened by communist subversion (as in the case of Operation Condor).

In the Cuban Missile Crisis of 1962, President John F. Kennedy cited the Monroe Doctrine as grounds for the United States' confrontation with the Soviet Union over the installation of Soviet ballistic missiles on Cuban soil.

The debate over this new interpretation of the Monroe Doctrine burgeoned in reaction to the Iran–Contra affair. It was revealed that the U.S. Central Intelligence Agency had been covertly training "Contra" guerrilla soldiers in Honduras in an attempt to destabilize and overthrow the Sandinista revolutionary government of Nicaragua and its president, Daniel Ortega. CIA director Robert Gates vigorously defended the Contra operation in 1984, arguing that eschewing U.S. intervention in Nicaragua would be "totally to abandon the Monroe Doctrine".

21st-century approaches

Kerry Doctrine
 
President Barack Obama's Secretary of State John Kerry told the Organization of American States in November 2013 that the "era of the Monroe Doctrine is over." Several commentators have noted that Kerry's call for a mutual partnership with the other countries in the Americas is more in keeping with Monroe's intentions than the policies enacted after his death.

America First
President Donald Trump implied potential use of the doctrine in August 2017 when he mentioned the possibility of military intervention in Venezuela, after his CIA Director Mike Pompeo declared that the nation's deterioration was the result of interference from Iranian- and Russian-backed groups. In February 2018, Secretary of State Rex Tillerson praised the  Monroe Doctrine as "clearly … a success",  warning of "imperial" Chinese trade ambitions and touting the United States as the region's preferred trade partner. Pompeo replaced Tillerson as Secretary of State in May 2018. Trump reiterated his commitment to the implementation of the Monroe Doctrine at the 73rd UN General Assembly in 2018. Vasily Nebenzya criticised the US for what the Russian Federation perceives as an implementation of the Monroe Doctrine at the 8452nd emergency meeting of the United Nations Security Council on January 26, 2019. Venezuela's representative listed 27 interventions in Latin America that Venezuela considers to be implementations of the Monroe Doctrine and stated that, in the context of the statements, they consider it "a direct military threat to the Bolivarian Republic of Venezuela". Cuba's representative formulated a similar opinion, "The current Administration of the United States of America has declared the Monroe Doctrine to be in effect..." 

On March 3, 2019, National Security Advisor John Bolton invoked the Monroe Doctrine in describing the Trump administration's policy in the Americas, saying "In this administration, we're not afraid to use the word Monroe Doctrine...It's been the objective of American presidents going back to President Ronald Reagan to have a completely democratic hemisphere."

Criticism
Historians have observed that while the Doctrine contained a commitment to resist further European colonialism in the Americas, it resulted in some aggressive implications for American foreign policy, since there were no limitations on the US's own actions mentioned within it. Historian Jay Sexton notes that the tactics used to implement the doctrine were modeled after those employed by European imperial powers during the 17th and 18th centuries. American historian William Appleman Williams, seeing the doctrine as a form of American imperialism, described it as a form of "imperial anti-colonialism". Noam Chomsky argues that in practice the Monroe Doctrine has been used by the U.S. government as a declaration of hegemony and a right of unilateral intervention over the Americas.

See also
 Banana Wars
 Foreign policy of the United States
 Gunboat diplomacy
 Latin America–United States relations
 Monroe Doctrine Centennial half dollar

References

Further reading

 14 articles by experts
Bemis, Samuel Flagg. John Quincy Adams and the Foundations of American Foreign Policy (1949) online
 Bingham, Hiram. The Monroe Doctrine: An Obsolete Shibboleth (Yale University Press, 1913); a strong attack; online
 Bolkhovitinov, Nikolai N., and Basil Dmytryshyn. "Russia and the Declaration of the non-colonization principle: new archival evidence." Oregon Historical Quarterly 72.2 (1971): 101–126. online

 Bryne, Alex. The Monroe Doctrine and United States National Security in the Early Twentieth Century (Springer Nature, 2020).
 Gilderhus, Mark T. (2006) "The Monroe Doctrine: meanings and implications." Presidential Studies Quarterly 36.1 (2006): 5–16. Online
 
 May, Robert E. (2017) "The Irony of Confederate Diplomacy: Visions of Empire, the Monroe Doctrine, and the Quest for Nationhood." Journal of Southern History 83.1 (2017): 69-106. excerpt
 
 
  Examines the cultural context of the doctrine. excerpt
 Nakajima, Hiroo. "The Monroe Doctrine and Russia: American views of Czar Alexander I and their influence upon early Russian-American relations." Diplomatic History 31.3 (2007): 439–463.

  3 vols.
 Poston, Brook. (2016) "'Bolder Attitude': James Monroe, the French Revolution, and the Making of the Monroe Doctrine" Virginia Magazine of History and Biography 124#4 (2016), pp. 282–315.  online
 Rossi, Christopher R. (2019) "The Monroe Doctrine and the Standard of Civilization." Whiggish International Law (Brill Nijhoff, 2019) pp. 123–152.

  290 pages; competing and evolving conceptions of the doctrine after 1823. excerpt

Primary sources
 Alvarez, Alejandro, ed. The Monroe Doctrine: Its Importance in the International Life of the States of the New World (Oxford University Press, 1924) includes statements from many countries online.

External links

 Monroe Doctrine and related resources at the Library of Congress
 Selected text from Monroe's December 2, 1823 speech
 Adios, Monroe Doctrine: When the Yanquis Go Home by Jorge G. Castañeda, The New Republic, December 28, 2009
 As illustrated in a 1904 cartoon

1823 introductions
1823 in American politics
1823 in international relations
Banana Wars
December 1823 events
Foreign policy doctrines of the United States
History of the foreign relations of the United States
History of United States expansionism
History of United States isolationism
Latin American history
Presidency of James Monroe
Spanish–American War
Spheres of influence
State of the Union addresses
United States documents
United States–Caribbean relations
United States–European relations
United States–South American relations